Peter Blais is a Canadian actor. He has won a Golden Sheaf Award for "Best Performance - Male" in The Wager, and in 1999 he was nominated for a Gemini Award for "Best Performance by an Actor in a Featured Supporting Role in a Dramatic Series" for his work in PSI Factor.

Blais attended Carleton University and joined the campus drama society, where he met Dan Aykroyd. They performed together in several amateur productions during the 1960s.

As a stage actor, he is best known for his frequent roles in the plays of George F. Walker, including the role of Viktor in the original production and a 1994 revival of Nothing Sacred and the role of Pete Maxwell in the original production of Love and Anger.

Partial filmography

Films
 Baby on Board (1991) — Bald Man
 The Wager (1998) — Victor
 Snow Angels (2007) — Mr. Eisenstat

Made-for-television films
 Trudeau (2002) — McIlwraith
 Plain Truth (2004) — Dr. Ziegler
 Trudeau II: Maverick in the Making (2005) — Professor Émilken Caron

Television
 Faerie Tale Theatre (1 episode) (1985) — Julius Caesar Rat
 Star Wars: Ewoks (1985)— Additional Voices
 The Ray Bradbury Theater (Skeleton) (1988) — Munigant
 War of the Worlds (1 episode) (1989) — Ralph
 Forever Knight (Crazy Love) (1995) — Barlow
 PSI Factor: Chronicles of the Paranormal (21 episodes) (1996–1999) — Lennox "L.Q." Cooper
 TekWar (Redemption) (1996)— Jonas La Salle (1 episode, 1996)
 Beach Girls (TV mini-series) (2005) — Judge

External links

L.Q. Coopers page Psi Factor Fan site

Living people
Canadian male film actors
Canadian male television actors
Canadian male voice actors
Carleton University alumni
Canadian male stage actors
Year of birth missing (living people)